Several Canadian naval units have been named HMCS Nipigon.

  (I) was a Bangor-class minesweeper that served in the Second World War.
  (II) was an Annapolis-class destroyer that served during the Cold War.

Battle honours
Atlantic, 1941–45.
Gulf of St. Lawrence 1942, 1944.

References

 Government of Canada Ships' Histories - HMCS Nipigon

Royal Canadian Navy ship names